The 2004 Gloucester City Council election took place on 10 June 2004 to elect members of Gloucester City Council in England. Ten of the 36 seats on the council were up for election, representing a nominal "third" of the council; there were no elections for Kingsholm and Wotton, Podsmead, Quedgeley Fieldcourt, Quedgeley Severn Vale or Westgate wards in 2004. The council remained under no overall control. Prior to the election the Labour and Liberal Democrats groups had been running a joint administration, with Mary Smith of Labour being the leader of the council. After the election, a Conservative minority administration was formed instead, with Mark Hawthorne becoming leader of the council.

Results  

|}

Ward results

Abbey

Barnwood

Barton and Tredworth

Elmbridge

Grange

Hucclecote

Longlevens

Matson and Robinswood

Moreland

Tuffley

References

2004 English local elections
2004
2000s in Gloucestershire